The Civilian Joint Task Force (CJTF) is a loose group of militants that was formed in Maiduguri, Borno State, Nigeria to help oust Boko Haram Islamist fighters from their city. The group possesses basic weapons and has female members. The vigilante group numbers over 26,000 in the northeastern Borno and Yobe States, of which only 1,800 receive a salary ($50 per month). The CJTF has suffered about 600 casualties in the conflict, counting both lost and missing members.

The CJTF has been accused of abuses, including slaughtering men beside a mass grave, diverting food destined for starving families and beating men and subjecting women and girls to systematic sexual violence in camps.

References

Boko Haram
Borno State
Counterterrorism in Nigeria
Rebel groups in Nigeria
Vigilantes
Yobe State